Curtiss "Curt" Kreun is an American politician serving as a member of the North Dakota Senate from the 42nd district. Kreun previously served as a member of the North Dakota House of Representatives from 2010 to 2014.

Early life and education 
Kreun was born in [Pipestone, Minnesota]. He earned a Bachelor of Science degree in education from Mayville State University.

Career 
Prior to entering politics, Kreun owned a childcare center and a commercial water hauling company. He also worked as an energy consultant, auto center manager, and construction manager. Kreun served as chair of the Grand Forks Housing Authority and was a member of the Grand Forks City Council from the city's fourth ward.

North Dakota Legislature 
Kreun represented the 43rd district in the North Dakota House of Representatives from 2010 to 2014. In November 2016, he was elected to the North Dakota Senate. During the 2017 legislative session, Kreun served as the vice chair of the Senate Energy and Natural Resources Committee. In the 2021–2022 session, he serves as chair of the committee.

References 

Living people
People from Grand Forks, North Dakota
Mayville State University alumni
Republican Party members of the North Dakota House of Representatives
Republican Party North Dakota state senators
Year of birth missing (living people)